Ralph Näf (born 10 May 1980) is a retired Swiss cross-country mountain biker. At the 2004 Summer Olympics, he competed in the men's cross-country, finishing in 6th place.  At the 2012 Summer Olympics, he competed in the Men's cross-country at Hadleigh Farm, finishing in 18th place.

References

Swiss male cyclists
Cross-country mountain bikers
Living people
Olympic cyclists of Switzerland
Cyclists at the 2004 Summer Olympics
Cyclists at the 2012 Summer Olympics
1980 births
People from Weinfelden District
UCI Mountain Bike World Champions (men)
Swiss mountain bikers
Sportspeople from Thurgau